The 1984 Big East men's basketball tournament took place at Madison Square Garden in New York City, from March 7 to March 10, 1984. Its winner received the Big East Conference's automatic bid to the 1984 NCAA tournament. It is a single-elimination tournament with four rounds.  Georgetown had the best regular season conference record and received the #1 seed.

Georgetown defeated Syracuse in the championship game 82–71, to claim its third Big East tournament championship.

Teams

Bracket

First round summary

Quarterfinals summary

Semifinals summary

Championship game summary

Announcers

Awards
Most Valuable Player: Patrick Ewing, Georgetown

All Tournament Team
 Patrick Ewing, Georgetown
 Andre Hawkins, Syracuse
 Michael Jackson, Georgetown
 Ed Pinckney, Villanova
 Dwayne Washington, Syracuse

References

External links
  

Tournament
Big East men's basketball tournament
Basketball in New York City
College sports in New York City
Sports competitions in New York City
Sports in Manhattan
Big East men's basketball tournament
Big East men's basketball tournament
1980s in Manhattan
Madison Square Garden